Lovie is a given name and a surname. People so named include:

 Lovie Austin (1887–1972), American female bandleader, piano player, composer and arranger 
 Lovie Gore (1904-1980), American politician
 Lovie Smith (born May 8, 1958), National Football League head coach
 Lovie Yancey (1912–2008), founder of the Fatburger restaurant chain
 Jim Lovie (born 1932), Scottish former footballer
 William James Lovie (1868–1938), Canadian farmer and politician
 Lovie Lee (1909–1997), American electric blues pianist and singer born Edward Lee Watson

See also
 Lovieanne Jung (born 1980), American retired softball player
 Lovi (disambiguation)
 Lovey (disambiguation)